Renzo Rovatti (born 30 June 1939 in Milan) is a retired Italian professional football player.

1939 births
Living people
Italian footballers
Serie A players
Inter Milan players
Palermo F.C. players
Aurora Pro Patria 1919 players
F.C. Pavia players
Italian expatriate footballers
Expatriate footballers in Switzerland
Italian expatriate sportspeople in Switzerland
FC Lugano players
Association football forwards